The International Organization of Legal Metrology ( - OIML), is an intergovernmental organisation that was created in 1955 to promote the global harmonisation of the legal metrology procedures that underpin and facilitate international trade.

Such harmonisation ensures that certification of measuring devices in one country is compatible with certification in another, thereby facilitating trade in the measuring devices and in products that rely on the measuring devices. Such products include weighing devices, taxi meters, speedometers, agricultural measuring devices such as cereal moisture meters, health related devices such as exhaust measurements and alcohol content of drinks.

Since its establishment, the OIML has developed a number of guidelines to assist its Members, particularly developing nations, to draw up appropriate legislation concerning metrology across all facets of society and guidelines on certification and calibration requirements of new products, particularly where such calibration has a legal impact such as in trade, health care and taxation.

The OIML works closely with other international organisations such as the International Bureau of Weights and Measures (BIPM) and International Organization for Standardization (ISO) to ensure compatibility between each organisation's work. The OIML has no legal authority to impose solutions on its Members, but its Recommendations are often used by Member States as part of their own national legislation.

, 62 countries had signed up as Member States and a further 63 as Corresponding (non-voting) Members including all the G20, EU and BRICS countries. Between them, the OIML Members cover 86 % of the world's population and 96 % of its economy.

The Headquarters of the OIML is located in Paris, France.

Definition of "legal metrology"
The definition of "legal metrology" varies amongst jurisdictions, reflecting the extent to which metrology is bound into the jurisdiction's own legal and regulatory code.  The OIML, in their publication International Vocabulary of Terms in Legal Metrology defined "legal metrology" as 

In the glossary of their book Metrology - in short Howarth and Redgrave state that "legal metrology"

These two statements are held together by the words "regulatory", "accuracy" and "reliability". The word "regulatory" encompasses the "legal" aspects of the term – the role played by governments, national metrology institutes and standards organisations in creating a framework to ensure confidence in the accuracy and reliability of a measurement. This framework requires that the specified test and conformance operations are carried out, and that the certificates pertaining to these operations are filed in a manner that enables third parties to assess them should the need arise.

The OIML has identified four main activities that fulfil the purposes of legal metrology:
Setting up of legal requirements,
Control/conformity assessment of regulated products and regulated activities,
Supervision of regulated products and of regulated activities,
Providing the necessary infrastructure for correct measurements.

History 
The International Organization of Legal Metrology (OIML), an intergovernmental organisation, was established under a diplomatic treaty signed in Paris on 12 October 1955 to promote the global harmonisation of legal metrology procedures that underpin and facilitate international trade. Under French law, its principal body, the International Conference on Legal Metrology, is accorded diplomatic status.

The Convention that set up the OIML listed eight objectives behind its establishment. At the 2011 meeting in Prague of the International Committee of Legal Metrology (CIML), the OIML updated its mission to read:

At the same meeting, its objectives were then stated as follows:
"To develop, in cooperation with our stakeholders, standards and related documents for use by legal metrology authorities and industry that when implemented will achieve the mission of the OIML".
"To provide mutual recognition systems which reduce trade barriers and costs in a global market".
"To represent the interests of the legal metrology community within international organisations and forums concerned with metrology, standardisation, testing, certification and accreditation".
"To promote and facilitate the exchange of knowledge and competencies within the legal metrology community worldwide".
"In co-operation with other metrology bodies, to raise awareness of the contribution that a sound legal metrology infrastructure can make to a modern economy".
"To identify areas for the OIML to improve the effectiveness and efficiency of its work".

Structure 
The OIML, which has an annual operating budget of about two million euros that comes from Member subscriptions is organised around a three-layer model:

The overall direction of the OIML is vested in the International Conference which meets every four years. The Conference is attended by delegations from Member States and [non-voting] Corresponding Members of the Organisation.

The management of the OIML is vested in the International Committee ( - CIML).  The Committee consists of one member from each Member State. These members normally have active official functions in legal metrology in their country. The Committee elects a non-salaried President for a six-year term of office from amongst its Members. The Committee meets annually under the chairmanship of its President.

Secretarial services, day-to-day running and financial management of the OIML are provided by the BIML. The BIML is the OIML headquarters, located in the 9th Arrondissement of Paris and is headed by a salaried director who is, ex-officio, secretary to both the International Conference and the International Committee.

Senior postholders

CIML Presidents
1956-1962 M. Jacob (Belgium)
1962-1968 J. Stulla-Götz (Austria)
1968-1980 A. van Male  (Netherlands)
1980-1994 K. Birkeland  (Norway)
1994-2003 G. Faber  (Netherlands)
2003-2005 M. Kochsiek  (Germany - Acting President )
2005-2011 A. Johnston   (Canada)
2011-2017 P. Mason (United Kingdom)
2017-date Dr. Roman Schwartz (Germany)

BIML Directors
1956-1973 M.V.D. Costamagna
1974-2001 B. Athané
2001-2010 J-F. Magaña
2011-2018 S. Patoray
2019-date A. Donnellan

Participation and membership
The OIML has two categories of membership; "Member State" and "Corresponding Member". The Member State category is for countries or economies that are prepared to finance and actively participate in the work of the OIML and which have acceded to the OIML Convention. 

The Corresponding Member category is for countries or economies that want to be informed of OIML activities, but cannot, or prefer not to, be a Member State. , a total of 62 states are Member States and 63 are Corresponding Members.

Member States

Corresponding Members

Work

Technical Committees
The technical work of the OIML is carried out by Technical Committees (TC), each committee having responsibility for a different aspect of legal metrology. In some cases the Technical Committee is broken up into one or more Subcommittees (SC). Within each TC or SC the actual technical work is carried out by Project Groups led by conveners. TCs, SCs and Project Groups are led by volunteer experts from OIML Member States.   there are 18 Technical Committees and 46 Subcommittees.  The Technical Committees are:

TC 1		Terminology
TC 2		Units of measurement
TC 3		Metrological control (5 SCs)
TC 4		Measurement standards and calibration and verification devices
TC 5		General requirements for measuring instruments (2 SCs)
TC 6		Prepackaged products
TC 7		Measuring instruments for length and associated quantities (4 SCs)
TC 8		Measurement of quantities of fluids (5 SCs)
TC 9		Instruments for measuring mass and density (4 SCs)
TC 10		Instruments for measuring pressure, force and associated quantities (5 SCs)
TC 11		Instruments for measuring temperature and associated quantities (3 SCs)
TC 12		Instruments for measuring electrical quantities
TC 13		Measuring instruments for acoustics and vibration
TC 14		Measuring instruments used for optics
TC 15		Measuring instruments for ionizing radiations (2 SCs)
TC 16		Instruments for measuring pollutants (4 SCs)
TC 17		Instruments for physico-chemical measurements (8 SCs)
TC 18		Medical measuring instruments (3 SCs)

Publications
The OIML produces a number of publications, including:

Vocabularies (prefixed by the letter "V") that provide standardised terminology in the field of metrology. The OIML has produced two principal works:

International Vocabulary of Terms in Legal Metrology (VIML) which defines the terms used in legal metrology.  The first edition of this work (1978) was the joint effort of seven international organisations -  BIPM, IEC, IFCC, ISO, IUPAC, IUPAP and the OIML.
Alphabetical list of terms defined in OIML Recommendations and Documents which defines the technical terms used in the various OIML Recommendations.

In addition, the OIML was a partner in the JCGM which produced the International vocabulary of metrology - Basic and general concepts and associated terms (VIM), a document published by the BIPM on behalf of the JCGM

Recommendations (prefixed by the letter "R") which are model regulations that establish the metrological characteristics required of certain measuring instruments and which specify methods and equipment for checking their conformity. Most of the Recommendations have a similar structure.  The four main topics covered in the reports are metrological requirements, technical requirements, methods and equipment for testing and verifying conformity to requirements and test report format. Recommendations are written in such a manner that they can be adopted "as is" by countries that wish to do so, or countries can select those parts that they wish to include in their own legislation.  104 Recommendations have been published, usually in both English and French.  Recommendations may be downloaded free of charge from the OIML website.

International Documents (prefixed by the letter "D"), which are informative in nature and intended to improve the work of the metrological services.  31 OIML Documents had been published in this series. Documents may be downloaded free of charge from the OIML website.

The OIML also published Basic Publications, Guides, Seminar Reports, Expert Reports and the OIML Bulletin.

OIML Certification System (OIML-CS) 

The OIML-CS is a system for issuing, registering and using OIML Certificates and their associated OIML type evaluation/test reports for types of measuring instruments (including families of measuring instruments, modules, or families of modules), based on the requirements of OIML Recommendations. It is a single Certification System comprising two Schemes: Scheme A and Scheme B. It was launched on 1 January 2018, replacing the OIML Basic Certificate System and the OIML Mutual Acceptance Arrangement (MAA).

The aim of the OIML-CS is to facilitate, accelerate and harmonise the work of national and regional bodies that are responsible for type evaluation and approval of measuring instruments subject to legal metrological control.

The objectives of the OIML-CS are

a) to promote the global harmonisation, uniform interpretation and implementation of legal metrological requirements for measuring instruments and/or modules,

b) to avoid unnecessary re-testing when obtaining national type evaluations and approvals, and to support the recognition of measuring instruments and/or modules under legal metrological control, while achieving and maintaining confidence in the results in support of facilitating the global trade of individual instruments, and

c) to establish rules and procedures for fostering mutual confidence among participating OIML Member States and Corresponding Members in the results of type evaluations that indicate conformity of measuring instruments and/or modules, under legal metrological control, to the metrological and technical requirements established in the applicable OIML Recommendation(s).

There are three categories of participants:

 OIML Issuing Authorities are participants from Member States that issue OIML type evaluation reports and OIML Certificates under the OIML-CS.
 Utilizers are participants from OML Member States that accept and utilise OIML Certificates and/or OIML type evaluation reports issued by OIML Issuing Authorities.
 Associates are participants from Corresponding Members that accept and utilise OIML Certificates and/or OIML type evaluation reports issued by OIML Issuing Authorities. Associates do not have voting rights in the Management Committee.

The requirements for the participation of OIML Issuing Authorities and their associated Test Laboratories in Scheme A or Scheme B are the same, but the method of demonstrating compliance is different. OIML Issuing Authorities are required to demonstrate compliance with ISO/IEC 17065 and Test Laboratories are required to demonstrate compliance with ISO/IEC 17025. For participation in Scheme B, it is sufficient to demonstrate compliance on the basis of “self-declaration” with additional supporting evidence. However, for participation in Scheme A, compliance shall be demonstrated by peer evaluation on the basis of accreditation or peer assessment.

Relationships 
The work of the OIML overlaps with the work of a number of other international organisations. In order to minimise the impact of this overlap and also to ensure that the work of the OIML and other organisations can intermesh with each other, the OIML and other organisations have exchanged memoranda of understanding (MoU) with each other.  the MoU in existence were:
On 3 December 2008 the International Bureau of Weights and Measures (BIPM), the United Nations Industrial Development Organization (UNIDO) and the OIML signed a three-way MoU whereby each would apply their own expertise in the best way possible to ensure the better implementation of capacity building activities in standards and conformity, as well as compliance with sanitary and phytosanitary (SPS) measures.
An MoU was signed with the International Organization for Standardization (ISO) on 10 June 1966, which was revised on 9 December 2008 whereby both organisations would cooperate via joint technical committees where applicable.  A number of OIML Recommendations that were at variance with certain ISO standards were withdrawn. A process to fast-track OIML Recommendations into ISO standards was also agreed. Joint reports issued by both organisations could be downloaded from the OIML website as with any other OIML document.
An MoU was signed with the International Electrotechnical Commission (IEC) on 13 October 2011 during the 46th CIML Meeting in Prague. Under the MoU, the two organisations agreed to keep each other informed of their activities, and where appropriate, to set up joint technical committees and issue joint recommendations. On 10 October 2018 at the 53rd CIML Meeting, held in Hamburg, Germany, a renewed MoU was signed by Mr. Frans Vreeswijk (General Secretary and CEO of the IEC) and Dr. Roman Schwartz (CIML President).
An MoU was signed with the International Laboratory Accreditation Cooperation (ILAC) on 12 November 2006 whereby ILAC and OIML would cooperate in the use of the OIML Mutual Acceptance Arrangement (MAA) tool and both organisations would cooperate in the field of harmonisation of accreditation by ILAC full members and peer assessments organised by the BIML.  On 28 October 2007, during the ILAC/IAF General Assembly in Sydney, the MoU was extended to include the International Accreditation Forum (IAF) whereby ILAC and the OIML would cooperate in the use of the OIML Mutual Acceptance Arrangement (MAA) tool and both organisations would cooperate in the field of harmonisation of accreditation by ILAC full members and peer assessments organised by the document Guide for the application of ISO/IEC Guide 65 to legal metrology was to be revised to bring it into line with other ISO standards, notably ISO 17021 and ISO 9001. A new MoU was signed on 28 October 2010 during the ILAC/IAF Joint General  Assembly in Shanghai. On 16 October  2014 at the IAF-ILAC Joint General Assembly, held in Vancouver, Canada, a  renewed MoU was signed by Mr. Peter Unger (ILAC Chair), Mr. Randy Dougherty  (IAF Chair) and Mr. Peter Mason (CIML President). Lastly, on 10 October 2018 at the 53rd CIML Meeting, held in Hamburg, Germany, a renewed MoU was signed by Ms. Merih  Malmqvist Nilsson (ILAC Chair), Mr. Xiao Jianhua (IAF Chair) and Dr. Roman  Schwartz (CIML President). The updates in the 2018 renewed MoU are mainly editorial in nature, most notably to address the OIML Certification System (OIML-CS) and to consolidate some parts of the existing  text.

See also 
 Measurement Canada
 WELMEC

Notes

References

External links
Official site

Organizations based in Paris
Organizations established in 1955
Standards organizations in France
International scientific organizations
Manufacturing
Metrology organizations
1955 establishments in France